The  was a national junior college in Hirosaki, Aomori, Japan.

History 
 1951 The predecessor of the school for nursing was founded.
 1957 The predecessor of the school for midwifery was founded.
 1967 The predecessor of the school for medical laboratory science was founded.
 1969 The predecessor of the school for Radiologic technology was founded.
 1975 Junior College or School of Allied Medical Sciences, Hirosaki University for nursing and midwifery opened.
 1976 Academic department of medical laboratory science was set up at the Junior College.
 1977 Academic department of Radiologic technology was set up at the Junior College.
 1980 Academic departments of Physical therapy and occupational therapy was set up at the Junior College.
 2000 The last student was registered.
 2003 Closed.

Academic departments
 nursing
 medical laboratory science
 Radiologic technology
 Physical therapy
 occupational therapy

Advanced courses
 Midwifery

See also 
 Hirosaki University

External links
  

Japanese junior colleges
Educational institutions established in 1975
Universities and colleges in Aomori Prefecture
Japanese national universities
1975 establishments in Japan